Alexander Evelyn Charlwood (25 November 1888 – 23 June 1974) was an English cricketer.  Charlwood was a right-handed batsman who occasionally fielded as a wicket-keeper.  He was born at Eastbourne, Sussex.

Charlwood made his first-class debut for Sussex against Middlesex in the 1911 County Championship.  He made nine further first-class appearances for the county, the last of which came against Warwickshire in the 1914 County Championship.  In his ten first-class matches, Charlwood scored a total of 165 runs at an average of 11.00, with a high score of 34.

He died at Hove, Sussex on 23 June 1974.

References

External links
Alexander Charlwood at ESPNcricinfo
Alexander Charlwood at CricketArchive

1888 births
1974 deaths
Sportspeople from Eastbourne
English cricketers
Sussex cricketers